The Chief Justice of the Supreme Court of Puerto Rico is the presiding officer of the Supreme Court of Puerto Rico. The post of Chief Justice was created by Article V of the Constitution of Puerto Rico. The constitution also established in several articles that the Chief Justice must:
 direct the administration of the courts,
 appoint an administrative director,
 chairman the board which revises Puerto Rico's senatorial and representative districts, and
 preside at the impeachment trial of the Governor of Puerto Rico.

The Chief Justice is also typically the judge that swears in the governor upon his inaugural term.

Chief Justices
 style="margin: 0 auto"
! scope=col style="text-align: left" | #
! scope=col style="text-align: left" | Portrait
! scope=col style="text-align: left" | Name
! scope=col style="text-align: left" | Took office
! scope=col style="text-align: left" | Left office
! scope=col style="text-align: left" | Appointed by
! scope=col style="text-align: left" | Other posts held
|-
! scope=row | 1
| 
| José Severo Quiñones
| 1900
| 1909
| William McKinley
|
|-
! scope=row | 2
|
| José Hernández Santiago
| 1909
| 1922
| William H. Taft
|
|-
! scope=row | 3
|
| Emilio del Toro Cuebas
| 1922
| 1943
| Warren G. Harding
|
 Associate Justice of the Supreme Court of Puerto Rico
|-
! scope=row | 4
| 
| Martín Travieso Nieva
| 1944
| 1948
| Franklin D. Roosevelt
|
 Senator of Puerto Rico
 Associate Justice of the Supreme Court of Puerto Rico
|-
! scope=row | 5
|
| Angel de Jesús Sánchez
| 1948
| 1951
| Harry S. Truman
|
 Associate Justice of the Supreme Court of Puerto Rico
|-
! scope=row | 6
|
| Roberto Todd Borrás
| 1951
| 1952
| Harry S. Truman
|
 Deputy Solicitor General
 Associate Justice of the Supreme Court of Puerto Rico
|-
! scope=row | 7
|
| A. Cecil Snyder
| 1953
| 1957
| Luis Muñoz Marín
|
 United States Attorney
 Associate Justice of the Supreme Court of Puerto Rico
|-
! scope=row | 8
|
| Jaime Sifre Dávila
| 1957
| 1957
| Luis Muñoz Marín
|
 Associate Justice of the Supreme Court of Puerto Rico
|-
! scope=row | 9
|
| Luis Negrón Fernández
| 1957
| 1972
| Luis Muñoz Marín
|
 Solicitor General
 Associate Justice of the Supreme Court of Puerto Rico
|-
! scope=row | 10
|
| Pedro Pérez Pimentel
| 1973
| 1974
| Rafael Hernández Colón
|
 District Judge
 Associate Justice of the Supreme Court of Puerto Rico
|-
! scope=row | 11
|
| José Trías Monge
| 1974
| 1985
| Rafael Hernández Colón
|
 Secretary of Justice
|-
! scope=row | 12
|
| Víctor Pons Núñez
| 1985
| 1992
| Rafael Hernández Colón
|
 Secretary of State
|-
! scope=row | 13
|
| José Andréu García
| 1992
| 2003
| Rafael Hernández Colón
|
 District Attorney
 Superior Court Judge
 Associate Justice of the Supreme Court of Puerto Rico
|-
! scope=row | 14
|
| Miriam Naveira Merly
| 2003
| 2004
| Sila María Calderón
|
 Solicitor General
 Associate Justice of the Supreme Court of Puerto Rico
|-
! scope=row | 15
|
| Federico Hernández Denton
| 2004
| 2014
| Sila María Calderón
|
 Secretary of Consumer Affairs
 Associate Justice of the Supreme Court of Puerto Rico
|-
! scope=row | 16
|
| Liana Fiol Matta
| 2014
| 2016
| Alejandro García Padilla
|
 Administrator, Puerto Rico Court of Appeals
 Associate Justice of the Supreme Court of Puerto Rico
|-
! scope=row | 17
| 
| Maite Oronoz Rodríguez
| 2016
| present
| Alejandro García Padilla
|
 Associate Justice of the Supreme Court of Puerto Rico
|-

References